Johan Eichfeld (26 January 1893 Paide – 20 April 1989 Tallinn) was a Soviet and Estonian biologist and politician.

From 1958 to 1961, he was the chairman of the Presidium of the Supreme Soviet of the Estonian Soviet Socialist Republic.

References

1893 births
1989 deaths
People from Paide
Academicians of the VASKhNIL
Corresponding Members of the USSR Academy of Sciences
Fourth convocation members of the Supreme Soviet of the Soviet Union
Fifth convocation members of the Supreme Soviet of the Soviet Union
Sixth convocation members of the Supreme Soviet of the Soviet Union
Seventh convocation members of the Supreme Soviet of the Soviet Union
Heads of state of the Estonian Soviet Socialist Republic
Heroes of Socialist Labour
Stalin Prize winners
Recipients of the Order of Friendship of Peoples
Recipients of the Order of Lenin
Recipients of the Order of the Red Banner of Labour
Estonian communists
Soviet communists
Estonian biologists
Soviet biologists